Calliergon giganteum, the giant spearmoss, giant calliergon moss, or arctic moss, is an aquatic plant found on lake beds in tundra regions. It has no wood stems or flowers, and has small rootlets instead of roots.

Calliergon giganteum survives in the cold climate by storing nutrients to be used in the formation of new leaves in the spring. It is one of about 2000 plant species on the tundra, most of which are mosses and lichens. The plant is eaten by migrating animals such as birds. The ground cover of Calliergon giganteum in the arctic has a warming effect which other plants benefit from.

"Calliergon giganteum" grows to be about 8 cm tall.

References

Flora of Bulgaria
Hypnales